Harris Building, also known as the Laird, Schober & Company Building, is a historic factory building located in the Logan Square neighborhood of Philadelphia, Pennsylvania. It was built in 1914–1915, and is an eight-story, "L"-shaped, reinforced concrete building clad in brick with terra cotta details. From 1914 to 1942, it housed Laird, Schober & Company, manufacturers of women's, children's, and misses' shoes.  It housed a clothing manufacturer until 1985.

It was added to the National Register of Historic Places in 2001.

References

Industrial buildings and structures on the National Register of Historic Places in Philadelphia
Industrial buildings completed in 1915
Logan Square, Philadelphia